Does may refer to:

 A form of the English verb do
 Deer, a ruminant mammal belonging to the family Cervidae
 plural of John Doe, a number of unnamed individuals
 Does (album), an album by rock/jazz band The Slip
 Does (band), a Japanese rock band